The 2016 New York Jets season was the franchise's 47th season in the National Football League, the 57th overall and the second under head coach Todd Bowles. The team failed to improve on their 10–6 record from 2015, and missed the playoffs for the sixth consecutive season, instead finishing 5–11 and last in their division.

Transactions

Coaching staff and personnel changes 
Special teams coordinator Bobby April, special teams assistant coach Steve Hagen and assistant offensive line coach Ron Heller were fired on January 6, 2016.
Brant Boyer was named the special teams coordinator on February 3, 2016.
Jeff Hammerschmidt was named assistant special teams coach on February 5, 2016.
David Diaz-Infante was named assistant offensive line coach, Tim Atkins was named defensive quality control coach and John Scott, Jr. was promoted to assistant defensive line coach on February 9, 2016.

Players

Arrivals 
The Jets signed Joseph Anderson, Deion Barnes, Brandon Bostick, Jarvis Harrison, Julian Howsare, Wes Saxton, Kevin Short, Deon Simon, Julian Stanford to reserve/future contracts on January 5, 2016.
The Jets signed Kendall James to a reserve/future contract on January 7, 2016.
The Jets signed Lawrence Okoye, Jesse Davis, Adrien Robinson, and Craig Watts to reserve/future contracts on January 11, 2016.
The Jets signed Chandler Worthy to a reserve/future contract on January 12, 2016.
The Jets signed Sean Hickey and Dominique Williams to reserve/future contracts on January 19, 2016.
The Jets signed Titus Davis to a reserve/future contract on January 28, 2016.
The Jets signed Dri Archer to a reserve/future contract on February 3, 2016.
The Jets signed Kyle Brindza to a reserve/future contract on February 5, 2016.
The Jets signed Freddie Bishop III on February 16, 2016.
The Jets signed Matt Forte and Khiry Robinson on March 10, 2016.
The Jets signed Steve McLendon on March 21, 2016.
The Jets signed Darryl Morris on March 25, 2016.
The Jets signed Jarvis Jenkins on March 30, 2016.
The Jets signed Bruce Carter on April 4, 2016
The Jets signed Jeremy Ross on April 8, 2016.
The Jets signed Luke Marquardt on April 20, 2016.
The Jets signed undrafted free agents Robby Anderson, Tarow Barney, Quenton Bundrage, Kyle Friend, Tom Hackett, Jalin Marshall, Ross Martin, Helva Matungulu, Doug Middleton, Julien Obioha, Claude Pelon, Lawrence Thomas and Jason Vander Laan on May 5, 2016.
The Jets signed Bryson Keeton and claimed Jerome Cunningham off waivers on May 9, 2016.
The Jets signed Romar Morris on May 24, 2016.
The Jets signed Shelby Harris on June 1, 2016.
The Jets signed Mike Liedtke on June 2, 2016.
The Jets signed Kyle Williams on June 17, 2016.
The Jets signed Bernard Pierce on July 27, 2016.
The Jets signed Terry Williams on August 3, 2016.
The Jets signed Matthew Tucker on August 4, 2016.
The Jets claimed Chris King off waivers on August 6, 2016.
The Jets signed Anthony Kelly and Christo Bilukidi on August 8, 2016.
The Jets re-signed Julien Obioha and placed him on injured reserve on August 10, 2016.
The Jets signed Lache Seastrunk on August 13, 2016.
The Jets signed Terry Williams and Jake Ceresna on August 14, 2016.
The Jets signed Antone Smith on August 16, 2016.
The Jets claimed Braedon Bowman, Brian Parker, Troymaine Pope and Darryl Roberts off waivers on September 4, 2016.
The Jets signed Antonio Allen on September 6, 2016.
The Jets signed Braedon Bowman on September 23, 2016.

Departures 
The Jets waived Kyle Brindza on February 18, 2016.
The Jets released Antonio Cromartie on February 22, 2016.
The Jets released Jeremy Kerley and Jeff Cumberland on March 9, 2016.
The Jets waived Sean Hickey on May 7, 2016.
The Jets waived Adrien Robinson and Dri Archer on May 9, 2016.
The Jets waived Jerome Cunningham on Mary 24, 2016.
The Jets waived Lawrence Okoye on June 1, 2016.
The Jets waived Luke Marquardt on June 2, 2016.
The Jets waived Quenton Bundrage on June 17, 2016.
The Jets waived Zac Stacy on July 27, 2016.
The Jets waived Tom Hackett on July 28, 2016.
The Jets waived/injured Kendall James on August 3, 2016.
The Jets waived Terry Williams on August 4, 2016.
Titus Davis left the team on August 6, 2016.
The Jets waived/injured Julien Obioha and placed Chris King on the reserve/did not report list on August 8, 2016.
The Jets waived/injured Matthew Tucker on August 13, 2016.
The Jets waived Anthony Kelly and Christo Bilukidi left the team on August 14, 2016.
The Jets placed Bernard Pierce on injured reserve on August 16, 2016. Pierce was released from the reserve list on August 20, 2016.
The Jets released Deion Barnes, Jesse Davis, Kyle Friend, Shelby Harris, Jarvis Harrison, Ross Martin, Helva Matungulu, Lache Seastrunk, Jason Vander Laan, Kyle Williams and Terry Williams on August 28, 2016.
The Jets waived/injured Dion Bailey, Jake Ceresna and Romar Morris on August 30, 2016.
The Jets released Jeremy Ross and Antone Smith, waived/injured Trevor Reilly and waived Jace Amaro, Tarow Barney, Freddie Bishop III, Tommy Bohanon, Taiwan Jones, Bryson Keeton, Mike Liedtke, Doug Middleton, Dee Milliner, Darryl Morris, Claude Pelon, Wes Saxton, Kevin Short, Zach Sudfeld, Kenbrell Thompkins, Craig Watts and Chandler Worthy on September 3, 2016.
The Jets waived Ronald Martin, Dexter McDougle and Dominique Williams and waived/injured Khiry Robinson on September 4, 2016.
The Jets released Matthew Tucker and Trevor Reilly from their injured reserve list and waived Brian Parker from the active roster after he failed his physical on September 6, 2016.
The Jets waived Braedon Bowman on September 13, 2016.
The Jets waived Julian Howsare on September 22, 2016.

Trades

To Jets 
The Denver Broncos traded Ryan Clady and their seventh round selection in the 2016 NFL Draft for the Jets' fifth round selection in the 2016 draft on April 10, 2016.

Practice squad

Arrivals
The Jets signed Craig Watts, Claude Pelon, Myles White, Freddie Bishop III, Bryson Keeton and Doug Middleton on September 4, 2016.
The Jets signed Dexter McDougle, Ronald Martin, Dominique Williams and Raheem Mostert on September 6, 2016.
The Jets signed Victor Ochi and Wendall Williams on September 12, 2016.
The Jets signed Braedon Bowman on September 19, 2016.
The Jets signed Julian Howsare on September 24, 2016.

Departures
The Jets waived Raheem Mostert and Myles White on September 12, 2016.
The Jets waived Claude Pelon on September 19, 2016.

Free agents

Draft

Notes
 The Jets traded their fifth-round selection to the Denver Broncos in exchange for Denver's seventh-round selection and offensive tackle Ryan Clady.
 The Jets traded their seventh-round selection to the Houston Texans in exchange for quarterback Ryan Fitzpatrick; the selection was upgraded to a sixth-rounder as a result of Fitzpatrick's playing time with the Jets in 2015.
 The Jets traded their 2017 fourth-round selection to the Washington Redskins in exchange for their 2016 fifth-round selection, which they used to select Brandon Shell.

Preseason

Schedule

Regular season

Schedule

Note: Intra-division opponents are in bold text.

Standings

Division

Conference

Staff

Final roster

Regular season results

Week 1: vs. Cincinnati Bengals

The Jets held a 22–20 lead going into the final minute, but Mike Nugent kicked the game-winning field goal for the Bengals with 54 seconds remaining. With the loss, the Jets started 0–1. This was also their first home loss to the Bengals since 1981.

Week 2: at Buffalo Bills

The Jets broke their five-game losing streak against the Bills as well as their losing streak on Thursday Night Football. The win was also the 400th career win in the franchise's history.

Week 3: at Kansas City Chiefs

Ryan Fitzpatrick threw a season high six interceptions in the loss. The Jets turned the ball over eight times as a team total. This was the first time the Jets turned it over 6+ times since 1976 against the Bengals.

Week 4: vs. Seattle Seahawks
With the loss, the Jets fell to 1-3.

Week 5: at Pittsburgh Steelers

Week 6: at Arizona Cardinals

Ryan Fitzpatrick was benched midway through the fourth quarter in favor of Geno Smith as the Jets fell to 1–5 on the season. This was the Jets' first loss to the Cardinals since 1975, when the Cardinals were based in St. Louis.

Week 7: vs. Baltimore Ravens
With the win, the Jets went to 2-5 and picked up their first home win of 2016.

Week 8: at Cleveland Browns
With the comeback win, the Jets improved to 3-5.

Week 9: at Miami Dolphins
With the loss, the Jets fell to 3-6 and lost at Miami for the first time since 2011.

Week 10: vs. Los Angeles Rams

In a game that involved one touchdown (which was the Jets' only score, with the failed PAT) and 3 field goals (all by the Rams), the Jets fell to 3–7 in their first meeting with the Rams as a Los Angeles team since 1992.

Week 12: vs. New England Patriots
With the heartbreaking loss, the Jets fell to 3-8.

Week 13: vs. Indianapolis Colts

With the huge loss, the Jets fell to 3–9, and were mathematically eliminated from postseason contention for the sixth consecutive season.  It was the Jets' first loss to the Colts since the 2009 AFC Championship Game.

Week 14: at San Francisco 49ers
With the win, the Jets improved to 4-9. They also improved to 3-10 all time against the 49ers.

Week 15: vs. Miami Dolphins

With the loss, the Jets fell to 4–10 and were swept by the Dolphins for the first time since 2009.

Week 16: at New England Patriots

With the loss, the Jets fell to 4–11. They were also given their worst defeat since losing 49–9 to Cincinnati in 2013 and their worst loss to the Patriots since 2012.

Week 17: vs. Buffalo Bills
With the win, the Jets finished their season at 5-11, and swept Buffalo for the first time since 2011.
In this game, the Bills botched a kickoff return, when no when on the Bills went to recover a kick in the endzone. The result was Doug Middleton recovering the kick for a touchdown

References

External links

 

New York Jets seasons
New York Jets
New York Jets season
21st century in East Rutherford, New Jersey
Meadowlands Sports Complex